During the afternoon of April 27, 2011, a violent EF5 tornado touched down in eastern Mississippi, killing three people. Part of the historic 2011 Super Outbreak, the largest tornado outbreak on record, this was the first of four EF5 tornadoes to touch down that day and the first such storm in Mississippi since the 1966 Candlestick Park tornado. While on the ground for 30 minutes, it traveled along a  path through four counties, leaving behind three deaths, eight injuries, and $1.1 million in damage.

The supercell thunderstorm that produced this tornado formed around 1:00 p.m. CDT south of Jackson, Mississippi. Traveling briskly to the northeast, it became severe within 25 minutes and potentially tornadic by 1:36 p.m. CDT. A tornado finally touched down at 2:30 p.m. CDT just east of the Philadelphia Municipal Airport. It quickly intensified and began producing EF5 damage by 2:38 p.m. After crossing into Kemper County, the tornado obliterated a mobile home, killing all three inside. It reached EF5 strength a second time near the Kemper–Winston county line where extreme ground scouring again took place and pavement was scoured from roads. Extensive tree damage took place elsewhere along the track and it ultimately dissipated at 3:00 p.m.

Meteorological synopsis

The environmental conditions leading up to the April 2011 Super Outbreak were among the "most conducive to violent tornadoes ever documented". On April 25, a vigorous upper-level shortwave trough moved into the Southern Plains states. Ample instability, low-level moisture, and wind shear fueled a significant tornado outbreak from Texas to Tennessee; at least 64 tornadoes touched down that same day. An area of low pressure consolidated over Texas on April 26 and traveled east while the aforementioned shortwave trough traversed the Mississippi River and Ohio River valleys. Another 50 tornadoes touched down on that day. The multi-day outbreak culminated on April 27 with the most violent recorded day of tornadic activity since the 1974 Super Outbreak. Multiple episodes of tornadic activity ensued with two waves of mesoscale convective systems in the morning hours, followed by a widespread outbreak of supercells from Mississippi to North Carolina during the afternoon into the evening.

Activity on April 27 was precipitated by a 995 mbar (hPa; 29.39 inHg) surface low situated over Kentucky and a deep, negatively tilted (aligned northwest to southeast) trough over Arkansas and Louisiana. A strong southwesterly surface jet intersected these systems at a 60° angle, an ageostrophic flow that led to storm-relative helicity values in excess of 500 m2s−2—indicative of extreme wind shear and a very high potential for rotating updrafts within supercells. Furthermore, convective available potential energy (CAPE) values reached 2,500–3,000 J/kg−1.

Tornado summary

Around 1:00 p.m. The developing storm gradually developed a hook echo signature, and a tornado warning was issued for Leake and Scott counties at 1:36 p.m. CDT, and extended to Neshoba County at 2:03 p.m. CDT. At 2:30 p.m. CDT, the storm produced a small tornado along the northern edge of Philadelphia, just east of Philadelphia Municipal Airport and near an Army National Guard armory. Here, large trees were downed and a building sustained significant damage of this roof. Within minutes, the tornado began producing EF2 damage to homes and other structures. CDT.

Traveling along and parallel to MS 21, the tornado leveled and partially swept away a brick home near the intersection with MS 491, indicative of low-end EF4 damage. A debris ball was apparent on Doppler weather radar imagery by this time. The storm began producing EF5 damage at 2:38 p.m. CDT in northeastern Neshoba County. Grass was torn out by the roots and in clumps by suction vortices embedded within the tornado. The storm moved through the Pearl River Resort, where it destroyed a historic log cabin, fencing, lighting, and dugouts at two baseball fields. As the storm neared the edge of Neshoba County, the tornado emergency was extended to include northern Kemper County, southeastern Winston County, and all of Noxubee County. The tornado weakened briefly as it passed through the small community of Coy along the Neshoba–Kemper County line. Some trees took some extensive damage and a mobile home was destroyed. Upon leaving the community, the tornado intensified and produced EF5 damage again by 2:47 p.m. CDT. Throughout Neshoba County, the tornado damaged or destroyed 91 structures, leaving about 32 people homeless.

In Kemper County, a 3,000 sq-ft (280 m2) mini-mart was damaged beyond repair. Eleven people sought refuge inside the building's bathroom when the tornado struck; all escaped without injuries. Along the Kemper-Winston County line, EF5 damage occurred as extremely deep ground scouring took place again and asphalt was ripped from roads. On Green Road, a double-wide mobile home, anchored to the ground, was lofted  and obliterated when it landed in a nearby tree line; debris from the home was scattered hundreds of yards farther. The survey team found no evidence of it having bounced or rolled from where it was picked up to where it impacted the tree line. All three occupants were killed, the sole fatalities from this tornado. Nearby, the tornado weakened to EF3 strength as two brick homes were destroyed with barely any interior walls left standing; two people sustained serious injuries. A well-built frame wood home was nearly swept clean off its foundation and two trailers were destroyed. Cars were hurled hundreds of yards, often bouncing along the way, and some were rendered almost unrecognizable and were wrapped around trees. Continuing through southeastern Winston County, the tornado weakened slightly to EF2 strength but continued to produce extensive tree and property damage. As it crossed Central McDonald Road, it destroyed a single-wide mobile home and leveled a nearby grove of pine trees.

As the tornado approached the Winston–Noxubee border, it caused substantial roof damage to a church and left impact holes in the back wall. Extreme tree damage was noted along the border as the tornado regained EF3 intensity. Along Butler Road, to the southwest of Macon, additional pavement scouring took place, along with the destruction of a shop and a bus being rolled. CDT. Throughout its 30-minute track, the tornado traveled , killed three people, injured eight others, and caused $1.1 million in damage.

The supercell that produced this EF5 tornado later spawned an EF1 tornado in northeastern Noxubee County at 3:18 p.m. CDT. The parent storm dissipated around 3:29 p.m. CDT as another supercell overtook it near the Mississippi–Alabama state line. The Philadelphia tornado marked the first instance of an F5 or EF5 tornado in Mississippi since the March 3, 1966, Candlestick Park tornado. Following another EF5 tornado that struck Smithville later on April 27, the outbreak marked the first known instance of two EF5 tornadoes on a single day in Mississippi.

Aftermath
Immediately following the destructive tornadoes, Mississippi Governor Haley Barbour declared a state of emergency for 39 counties. On April 29, President Barack Obama signed a major disaster declaration for 29 Mississippi counties in the wake of the Super Outbreak and another deadly outbreak on April 15. This allowed residents and some local governments to sign up to receive federal funding to repair damage incurred from the storms. More than 60 members of the Longino Baptist Church assisted residents of Neshoba County with debris removal and cleaning; also providing refreshments. The Salvation Army established a feeding center at the Coy Methodist Church. Disaster unemployment assistance was made available for people who lost their jobs due to storms and flooding, starting on May 17. By July, a total of $15,734,072 in federal funding was approved through the Federal Emergency Management Agency for victims of the April 15–28 storms.

See also
List of F5 and EF5 tornadoes
List of tornadoes in the 2011 Super Outbreak
List of United States tornado emergencies

References

External links
Service Assessment: The Historic Tornadoes of April 2011
Summary of the April 25–27, 2011, tornado outbreak from the Jackson, Mississippi, National Weather Service office

Tornado,2011-04-27,Philadelphia, Mississippi
Philadelphia tornado
F5 tornadoes by date
Philadelphia, Mississippi
04-27
Tornadoes in Mississippi
Philadelphia, Mississippi tornado
Philadelphia, Mississippi